was a Japanese female artistic gymnast, representing her nation at international competitions.

She participated at the 2004 Summer Olympics. She also competed at the world championships, including the 2006 World Artistic Gymnastics Championships in  Aarhus, Denmark.

References

External links
Manami Ishizaka at Sports Reference
http://www.gymmedia.com/artistic-gymnastics/Tomita-and-Ishizaka-win-NHK-Cup
http://www.alamy.com/stock-photo-japans-gymnast-manami-ishizaka-performs-on-the-balance-beam-during-120542525.html
https://www.youtube.com/watch?v=4KWAWvVi7xg

1986 births
Living people
Japanese female artistic gymnasts
Gymnasts from Tokyo
Gymnasts at the 2002 Asian Games
Gymnasts at the 2006 Asian Games
Gymnasts at the 2004 Summer Olympics
Olympic gymnasts of Japan
Asian Games medalists in gymnastics
Asian Games silver medalists for Japan
Asian Games bronze medalists for Japan
Medalists at the 2002 Asian Games
Medalists at the 2006 Asian Games
21st-century Japanese women